Niranjan Godbole (born 26 November 1976) is an Indian cricketer. He has played 24 First class and 23 List A matches. He was the top run scorer in the first edition(2002–03) of the Vijay Hazare Trophy.

References

External links 
Niranjan Godbole at ESPNcricinfo

Indian cricketers
Living people
1976 births
Maharashtra cricketers
People from Nagpur
West Zone cricketers